Night Birds may refer to:

 Night Birds (album), a 1982 album by Shakatak
 "Night Birds", the album's title track
 Night Birds (film), a 1930 British thriller film
 Night Birds (band), an American punk rock band who appeared at Insubordination Fest 2010